Rob Delaney (born January 19, 1977) is an American comedian, actor, writer, and activist. He was the co-star and co-writer of the TV show Catastrophe, and has appeared in comedy films such as Deadpool 2 (2018) and Tom & Jerry (2021).

Early life
Delaney was born in Boston, Massachusetts, on January 19, 1977, the son of Nancy and Robert Delaney. He grew up in Marblehead, Massachusetts. He is of Irish descent. He attended New York University's Tisch School of the Arts and graduated with a degree in musical theater in 1999.

Career

Twitter
Delaney came to the attention of the public via Twitter, where he began posting in 2009. By 2016, he had over 1.2 million followers. While other comics were hesitant to share their material on social media, he is considered one of the first comedians to use social media to publish jokes. He credited Irish comedy writer Graham Linehan with his rise in popularity after Linehan began responding to his tweets. In 2010, Paste magazine named Delaney one of the 10 funniest people on Twitter. In May 2012, he became the first comedian to win the award for "Funniest Person on Twitter" at The Comedy Awards.

Writing
Delaney has written articles for Vice and The Guardian. His book Rob Delaney: Mother. Wife. Sister. Human. Warrior. Falcon. Yardstick. Turban. Cabbage. was published by Spiegel & Grau in November 2013. His memoir A Heart That Works, about the loss of his two-and-a-half-year-old son Henry to brain cancer, was published by Spiegel & Grau in 2022.

Acting

Television 

In December 2011, Comedy Central announced that Delaney would shoot a pilot for a variety show, called @RobDelaney. However, the series was not picked up. Instead, Delaney moved on to co-write and co-star with Sharon Horgan in Catastrophe, that began airing in the UK on January 19, 2015, on Channel 4. The show follows their characters after they get together following a brief affair while he is in the UK on business, and then moves there permanently after he learns that she has become pregnant. It debuted in the United States on Amazon in June 2015. The program ended after four seasons. Channel 4 aired the concluding episode on February 12, 2019, while Amazon announced the US release date to be March 15 of the same year. The series earned him his sole Emmy nomination, for "Outstanding Comedy Writing".

Since moving to the UK in 2014, Delaney has appeared on several British panel shows, including Have I Got News for You, Would I Lie to You?, 8 Out of 10 Cats Does Countdown, The Big Fat Quiz of the Year and Room 101.  In 2016, he appeared on Travel Man as a guest host for the Spanish city of Seville, and in March 2021, he was the guest announcer on Ant & Dec's Saturday Night Takeaway.

Film 
In the film Deadpool 2 (2018), Delaney played Peter, an average middle-aged man who has no superpowers and joins Deadpool's X-Force. As part of the film's promotion, a Twitter account was launched in Peter's name.

Throughout 2019, Delaney had a series of cameos in Hollywood blockbuster films. He reteamed with director David Leitch and actor Dwayne Johnson for Hobbs & Shaw, in which he appeared as Agent Loeb. He appeared as a theater director in Paul Feig's comedy-drama Last Christmas. Both movies went to No. 1 at the UK box office. He also appeared opposite Anne Hathaway in The Hustle as Todd and the Fox News drama Bombshell co-starring Charlize Theron. He filmed a cameo as Elvis Presley in Dexter Fletcher's Elton John musical biopic Rocketman, which was omitted from the theatrical cut. It was also reported that he would appear opposite Reynolds another time, in Pokémon: Detective Pikachu. However, he did not appear in the final film. In September 2019 he was cast in The Good House opposite Sigourney Weaver and Kevin Kline.

Personal life
Delaney is married to Leah (date unknown). They reside in London and have had four sons together. In February 2018, Delaney revealed that their son Henry had died in January at the age of two-and-a-half, having received extensive treatment for a brain tumor since 2016. The couple's fourth son was born in August 2018. In 2020 he wrote about getting a vasectomy.

Delaney has publicly shared his experience with multiple health concerns, including depression and alcoholism. In 2002, he blacked out while driving and drove into a building owned by the Los Angeles Department of Water and Power. In the wreck, he broke his left wrist and right arm, and had both of his knees scratched to the bone. This prompted him to stop drinking.

In 2018, Delaney became the first presenter on the CBeebies Bed Time Stories programme to tell a story in Makaton, which he used to communicate with his late son Henry.

On Sara Cox's show Between the Covers, Delaney chose the short story collection A Manual for Cleaning Women by Lucia Berlin as one of his favorite books.

Delaney is an atheist.

Political views
In June 2017 he endorsed the Labour Party in the 2017 general election, despite being unable to vote as a non-UK citizen (but longtime resident). In November 2018, he supported a petition organized by Labour campaign group Momentum calling on Labour MPs to vote against the EU withdrawal agreement which had been negotiated by Theresa May's government.

In November 2019, Delaney joined other public figures in signing a letter supporting Labour Party leader Jeremy Corbyn, describing him as "a beacon of hope in the struggle against emergent far-right nationalism, xenophobia and racism in much of the democratic world" and endorsed him in the 2019 UK general election. In December 2019, along with 42 other public figures, he signed a letter endorsing the Labour Party under Corbyn's leadership in the 2019 general election. The letter stated that "Labour's election manifesto under Jeremy Corbyn's leadership offers a transformative plan that prioritises the needs of people and the planet over private profit and the vested interests of a few".

In 2016, Delaney became a member of the Democratic Socialists of America.

Filmography

Film

Television

References

External links 

 
 

1977 births
Living people
Male actors from Washington, D.C.
American expatriates in England
American male film actors
American male television actors
American male voice actors
American people of Irish descent
American anti-fascists
American stand-up comedians
Male actors from Massachusetts
Massachusetts socialists
California socialists
Members of the Democratic Socialists of America
Labour Party (UK) people
People from Marblehead, Massachusetts
People from Silver Spring, Maryland
People with mood disorders
Tisch School of the Arts alumni
21st-century American comedians
Massachusetts Democrats
American atheists